Kandhote is a village in the Doda district of the Jammu and Kashmir union territory of India.
Climate here is not too much cold and not that much hot.
There are the variety of spring water. The main crops grown here are corn, wheat, rice, pulses etc.
The place is also known for its fruits mainly like apples, oranges, pears, apricots, aalo-bhukhaara.
Walnuts are in huge demand.
There are so nice picnic spots but mainly due to incomplete road connectivity people don't know much about the place.

References

Villages in Doda district
Chenab Valley